Climate change in Indonesia is of particular significance, because its enormous coastal population is particularly at risk to sea level rise. The livelihoods of many of Indonesians dependent on agriculture, mariculture and fishing could be severely impacted by temperature, rainfall and other climatic changes. Some environmental issues in Indonesia such as the cutting of mangrove forests (i.e. in Java) to make room for fish farms further worsen the effects of climate change (i.e. sea level rise). Jakarta has been listed as the world's most vulnerable city to climate change. In 2019 Indonesia is estimated to have emitted 3.4% of world greenhouse gas emissions: from deforestation, peatland fires, and fossil fuels.

Greenhouse gas emissions

 Indonesia is the 5th heaviest cumulative emitter at over 100 Gt. Emissions for 2019 are estimated at 3.4% of the world total. Indonesia has been called the "most ignored emitter" that "could be the one that dooms the global climate." Coal in Indonesia is a big emitter, because the government subsidizes coal power.  over 30 coal-fired power plants are planned or under construction, and corruption has been alleged. Perusahaan Listrik Negara, the state electricity company, is in financial difficulties but, intends to build more coal-fired power stations.

Impacts on the natural environment

Temperature and weather changes 
Global climate change is expected to increase temperatures in Indonesia by 0.8 °C by 2030.

Sea level rise and land subsidence 
Difference in sea level rise can differ seasonally during monsoons, where they may average higher in the northwest and lower in the southeast, as well as the variation in tectonic activity in the massive archipelagic state. While the mean sea level rise globally was 3-10mm/year, the subsidence rate for Jakarta was around 75-100mm/year, making the relative rise in sea level nearly 10cm/year. Continued carbon emissions at the 2019 rate, in combination with unlicensed groundwater extraction, is predicted to immerse 95% of Northern Jakarta by 2050.

Some studies have suggested that climate change induced sea level rise may be minimal compared to the rise induced by lack of water infrastructure and rapid urban development. The Indonesian government views land subsidence, mostly due to over extraction of groundwater, as the primary threat to Jakarta's infrastructure and development. Dutch urban planning is in large part to blame for the water crisis today as a consequence of canals built during the colonial era which intentionally subdivided the city, segregating indigenous people and Europeans, providing clean water access and infrastructure almost exclusively to European settlers. Due to the lack of access to clean water in Jakarta outside of wealthier communities, many locals have been pushed to extract groundwater without permits. Jakarta's growing population and rapid urban development has been eating away at the surrounding agriculture further destroying natural flood mitigation, such as forests, and polluting river systems relied on by predominantly poorer locals pushing said locals to rely on groundwater.  In 2019, water pipes in Jakarta reached only sixty percent of the population.

Despite this being a very pressing issue in the city, almost half of the local population does not know or have not been made aware of the correlation between land subsidence, their extraction and increased flooding making an organized approach to this issue much more difficult. The issue has persisted so long that Indonesia has confirmed the movement of their nation's capital, Jakarta, to a new city in East Kalimantan in the island of Borneo, citing the land subsidence issue as a primary reason. The movement of the capital to Borneo, in part, minimizes the effects of natural disasters due to its strategic location, but the rapid pace of the planned relocation may exacerbate environmental issues on the island in the near future, particularly biodiversity loss.

Impacts on people

Economic impacts

Agriculture 
Changes in rainfall patterns are predicted to have an adverse impact on Indonesian agriculture, due to shorter rainy seasons. Indonesia experienced crop losses and adverse impacts to fisheries as a result of climate change as early as 2007.

Fishery 
By 2020, climate change had impacted Indonesia's fishermen.

Mitigation and adaptation

Mitigation approaches 

Coal is expected to provide the majority of Indonesia's energy through 2025. Indonesia is one of the world’s biggest producers and exporters of coal. In order to keep its commitments to the Paris Agreement, Indonesia must stop building new coal plants, and stop burning coal by 2048.

Indonesia’s first wind farm opened in 2018, the 75MW Sidrap Wind Farm in Sidenreng Rappang Regency, South Sulawesi. Indonesia announced it was unlikely to meet the 23% renewable energy by 2025 target set in the Paris Agreement.

In 2020, "Indonesia will begin integrating the recommendations from its new Low Carbon Development Initiative into its 2020–2024 national development plan." Mangrove protection and restoration will play an important role in meeting the goal of cutting greenhouse gas emissions by over 43 percent by 2030.

Policies and legislation 
In February 2020, it was announced that the People's Consultative Assembly is preparing its first renewable energy bill.

Also in February 2020, proposed changes to environmental deregulation have raised new concerns, and could "allow illegal plantations and mines to whitewash their operations."

Society and culture 
A 2019 survey by YouGov and the University of Cambridge concluded that at 18%, Indonesia has "the biggest percentage of climate deniers, followed by Saudi Arabia (16 percent) and the U.S. (13 percent)."

Climate education is not a part of the school curriculum.

See also 
 Flooding in Jakarta
 Climate of Indonesia
 Environment of Indonesia
 Environmental issues in Indonesia
Energy in Indonesia
 Regional effects of global warming
 Climate change in Papua New Guinea
 Climate change in Malaysia

References

External links 

Climate Action Tracker Indonesia
Climate Watch Indonesia

 
Environmental issues in Indonesia
Indonesia